Pyramids Football Club ( or ) is an Egyptian professional football club based in Cairo that competes in the Egyptian Premier League, the highest league in the Egyptian football league system. Formed in 2008 as Al Assiouty Sport in Beni Seuf, the club was bought and moved to Cairo in 2018. Pyramids FC play their home matches at the 30 June Stadium.

History

Al Assiouty Sport
The club was formed as Al Assiouty Sport in Beni Seuf in 2008. The club was promoted to the Egyptian Premier League for the first time in 2014, but finished 19th and were relegated in their first season. They won Group A of the Second Division in 2016–17 and were promoted back to the Premier League.

Pyramids FC era: 2018–present

In the summer of 2018, the Chairman of the Saudi Sports Authority Turki Al-Sheikh bought Al Assiouty Sport. Previously the honorary president of Al Ahly, Al Sheikh resigned from his position following disagreements about signings and stadium construction, and bought the club from Beni Seuf. The team's name was changed to Pyramids FC, and the club moved 400 km to Cairo. Former Al Ahly coach, Hossam El-Badry was announced as chairman of the club, Ahmed Hassan as spokesman and football team supervisor, Hady Khashaba as football director and former Botafogo coach Alberto Valentim as the new manager.

In their first season under the new name, Pyramids finished the 2018–19 Egyptian Premier League in third place, qualifying for the 2019–20 CAF Confederation Cup, and reached the 2019 Egypt Cup Final, where they lost 3–0 to Zamalek. In July 2019, the Emirati businessman Salem Al Shamsi acquired the ownership of the club. Pyramids FC managed to establish thenselves as Egypt's 3rd best team always placing third except in the 21-22 season where they finished second only behind Zamalek.

First participation in African tournaments
Competing in a continental tournament for the first time, Pyramids reached the final of the 2019–20 CAF Confederation Cup despite starting the competition in its preliminary rounds. After beating Étoile du Congo, CR Belouizdad, and Young Africans in the qualifiers they went on to top their group in the First Round, containing Enugu Rangers, FC Nouadhibou, and Al-Masry, winning all bar one of their games. In the quarter-final they beat Zanaco 3–1 over two legs, and then won 1–0 against Horoya in the semi-final. In the final, held in Rabat, they lost 1–0 to Moroccan side RS Berkane. In the league, Pyramids again finished third, in a season disrupted by the COVID-19 pandemic, again qualifying for the following season's CAF Confederation Cup.

Value

Pyramids FC became one of the most valuable African sports clubs in 2022:

Honours

Domestic competitions
Egyptian Premier League
Runners-up (1): 2021–22
Egypt Cup
Runners-up (1): 2018–19

International competitions
CAF Confederation Cup
Runners-up (1): 2019–20

Kit suppliers and shirt sponsors

Statistics

Performance in  competitions

Performance in CAF competitions
PR = Preliminary round
FR = First round
SR = Second round
PO = Play-off round
QF = Quarter-final
SF = Semi-final

Notes

Players

Current squad

Out on loan

Pyramids FC managers

References

 
Egyptian Second Division
Association football clubs established in 2008
2008 establishments in Egypt
Football clubs in Cairo